Esmeralda was developed as a custom design by naval architect Philip Watts for the Chilean Navy during the Argentine–Chilean naval arms race.

Background and design 

This Esmeralda was purchased in part with US$1,500,000 in funds garnered from the sale of an earlier protected cruiser of the same name to Japan via Ecuador.

The new ship was defined by historian Adrian J. English as "the first armored cruiser to be built for any navy," and the contemporary Naval Annual called it "one of the most powerful cruisers in the world." Another historian, Peter Brook, has written that Esmeralda should be classified as a lesser "belted" cruiser due to design faults present after its conversion from a protected cruiser while under construction.

Service 

On 18 December 1907, the ship brought troops from Valparaíso to Iquique to repress thousands of miners from different nitrate mines in Chile's north who were appealing for government intervention to improve their living and working conditions. This later developed into the Santa María School massacre.

Esmeralda served in the Chilean Navy until 1930.

See also
 South American dreadnought race
 List of decommissioned ships of the Chilean Navy

Notes

References
 Brooke, Peter. Warships for Export: Armstrong Warships 1867–1927. Gravesend, UK: World Ship Society, 1999. .
 Chesneau, Roger and Eugene M. Kolesnik. Conway's All the World's Fighting Ships 1860–1905. London: Conway's Maritime Press, 1979. .

External links
 Chilean Navy site Esmeralda (1895), retrieved on 17 December 2012

Cruisers of the Chilean Navy
1896 ships